To go may be:
 an adjective referring to take-out food
 an adjective referring to software with minimalized memory usage for mobile devices
 the verb to go

See also 
 Togo
 Tugo